Tony Bujan is an American former tennis player.

Bujan grew up in Palm Desert, California and attended Indio High School. He played collegiate tennis for Texas Christian University, earning All-American honors in 1990 and 1992. His only ATP Tour main draw appearance came as a qualifier at the 1993 Los Angeles Open, where he lost his first round match in three sets to world number 70 Jeff Tarango. He reached his best singles world ranking of 477 in 1994.

References

External links
 
 

Year of birth missing (living people)
Living people
American male tennis players
TCU Horned Frogs men's tennis players
Tennis people from California
People from Palm Desert, California